The Local Government Act 2019 (Act No.1 of 2019; previously the Local Government Bill 2018, Bill No. 91 of 2018) is an Act of the Oireachtas (Irish parliament) which provided for the following: 
  The transfer of territory to Cork City Council area from Cork County Council area, with effect from the 2019 local elections, thereby implementing the Cork Local Government Implementation Oversight Group's recommendations
 The provision of plebiscites, which were held alongside the May 2019 local elections, to approve the principle of directly elected mayors for Cork City Council, Limerick City and County Council, and Waterford City and County Council, rejected in Cork and Waterford and only passed in Limerick. The proposed directly elected mayor for the Dublin metropolitan area was excluded from the act because of the greater complexity of the debate across four local government areas, with Fingal County Council having opposed previous proposals. Galway was also excluded because of the ongoing plans to merge Galway City Council and Galway County Council. On 2 April 2019 the government published more detailed proposals, agreed at the 20 March 2019 cabinet meeting, for the plebiscites and, for those passed, holding mayoral elections and granting powers to mayors. On 11 April 2019 the Dáil approved draft regulations for the plebiscites to take place. The Referendum Commission was not responsible for the plebiscites.

References

Sources

Citations

2019 in Irish law
Acts of the Oireachtas of the 2010s
Local government in the Republic of Ireland
Politics of Cork (city)
Politics of County Limerick
Politics of County Waterford